Ernest "Ernie McCoy" Musser (February 19, 1921 in Reading, Pennsylvania – February 4, 2001) was an American racecar driver.

McCoy's real name was Ernest Musser.

Indianapolis 500 results

World Championship career summary
The Indianapolis 500 was part of the FIA World Championship from 1950 through 1960. Drivers competing at Indy during those years were credited with World Championship points and participation. Ernie McCoy participated in 2 World Championship races but scored no World Championship points.

References

1921 births
2001 deaths
Indianapolis 500 drivers
Sportspeople from Reading, Pennsylvania
Racing drivers from Pennsylvania